Polygamy is not a prevalent practice in the island nation of Mauritius and polygamous unions are not legally recognized. However, the practice is not criminalized.

References

Mauritius
Society of Mauritius
Women's rights in Mauritius